Curtis Fleming (born April 25, 1955) is an American rower. He competed in the men's quadruple sculls event at the 1984 Summer Olympics.

References

External links
 

1955 births
Living people
American male rowers
Olympic rowers of the United States
Rowers at the 1984 Summer Olympics
Pan American Games medalists in rowing
Pan American Games silver medalists for the United States
Rowers at the 1983 Pan American Games